The Italian Athletics Indoor Championships are the national championships in athletics of the indoor events, organised every year by the Federazione Italiana di Atletica Leggera from 1970 (first edition was held in Genoa). Titles assigned concern specialties indoors, so for example does not include 3000 meters steeplechase, discus throw, javelin throw, hammer throw.

Editions

Championship records

Men

Women

Championship winners

See also
 List of Italian Athletics Indoor Championships winners
 Italian Athletics Championships
 Italian Winter Throwing Championships
 List of Italian Athletics Championships winners

References

External links
 

 

 
Indoor
Athletics competitions in Italy
National indoor athletics competitions
Recurring sporting events established in 1970
1970 establishments in Italy